Wiles is a surname. Notable people with the surname include:

Adam Wiles (born 1984), real name of Scottish singer, songwriter, DJ, and producer Calvin Harris
Andrew Wiles, British mathematician who proved Fermat's Last Theorem
Archie Wiles, cricketer from Trinidad
Billy Wiles, American wrestler
Collin Wiles, American baseball player
Irving Ramsey Wiles, United States artist
Jason Wiles, actor, director and producer
John Wiles, British television producer
Lemuel M. Wiles (1826–1905), American landscape painter.
Margaret Jones Wiles (1911-2000) American composer, conductor, and teacher
Maurice Wiles, British theologian, father of Andrew Wiles
Mary Kate Wiles, American film, TV and YouTube actor
Michele Wiles, principal dancer at American Ballet Theatre
Simon Wiles, English footballer
Siouxsie Wiles, microbiologist and science communicator

See also
9999 Wiles, an asteroid
Cape Wiles, a headland in South Australia
Wile (disambiguation)